Pankaj is a Hindu  given name, common in India and Nepal. It has its roots in the Sanskrit word  which refers to the lotus flower. The word is a compound of  'mud' and the suffix  'born from, growing in'. The associated symbolism is of the lotus that is born in mud and blossoms after arising from mud.
The lotus flower is also the national flower of India and is considered to be a symbol of Buddhist teaching (cf. Nalanda).

Notable people with the name

Pankaj Advani, an Indian billiards and snooker player
Pankaj Choudhary, an Indian politician of a party
Pankaj Dheer, an Indian actor
Pankaj Gupta, an Indian sports administrator and hockey manager
Pankaj Jain, an Indian American professor of religious studies, film studies, and sustainability
Pankaj Kapur, a Bollywood actor
Pankaj Manubhai Zaveri, an Indian cricketer
Pankaj Mishra, an Indian writer
Pankaj Mullick, a Bengali Indian music director
Pankaja Munde, an Indian politician
Pankaj Oswal, the former chairman and managing director of Burrup Holdings Limited
Pankaj Patel, the current chairman and managing director of Cadila Healthcare
Pankaj Rag, current director of the Film and Television Institute of India
Pankaj Roy, an Indian cricketer
Pankaj Sharma, an associate professor in clinical neurology at Imperial Collegem
Pankaj Singh, an Indian cricketer
Pankaj Tripathi, an Indian actor
Pankaj Udhas, an Indian Ghazal singer
Pankaj Sharma, Professor of Clinical Neurology

References and notes

Indian masculine given names